Gennady Borisovich Tartakovsky (born ), commonly known as  Tartakovsky, is a Russian-American animator, director, producer, screenwriter, voice actor, storyboard artist, comic book writer and artist. He is best known as the creator of various animated television series on Cartoon Network and Adult Swim, including Dexter's Laboratory, Samurai Jack, Star Wars: Clone Wars, Sym-Bionic Titan, and Primal.

He co-created Sym-Bionic Titan and directed the first three films in the Hotel Transylvania series. Additionally, he was a pivotal crew member of The Powerpuff Girls and worked on other series such as 2 Stupid Dogs and Batman: The Animated Series. Tartakovsky is well known for his unique animation style, including fast-paced action and minimal dialogue.

Throughout his career, Tartakovsky has won five Emmy Awards., three Annie Awards, one WAC Winner, one OIAF Award, one Winsor McCay Award, among other nominations for his works.

Early life
Tartakovsky was born on January 17, 1970, in Moscow, to Jewish parents. His father worked as a dentist for government officials and the Soviet Union national ice hockey team. Tartakovsky felt that his father was a very strict and old-fashioned man, but they had a close relationship. His mother, Miriam, was an assistant principal at a school. He has a brother, Alexander, who is two years older and a computer consultant in Chicago. Before coming to the United States, his family moved to Italy. There, Tartakovsky was first drawn to art, inspired by a neighbor's daughter. Tartakovsky later commented, "I remember, I was horrible at it. For the life of me, I couldn't draw a circle".

Tartakovsky's family moved to the United States when he was seven due to concerns about the effect of antisemitism on their children's lives. The family originally settled in Columbus, Ohio and later moved to Chicago. He was greatly influenced by the comics he found there; his first purchase was an issue of Super Friends. Tartakovsky began attending Chicago's Eugene Field Elementary School in the third grade. School was difficult because he was seen as a foreigner. He went on to attend Chicago's prestigious Lane Tech College Prep High School and says he did not fit in until his sophomore year. When he was 16, his father died of a heart attack. Afterwards, Tartakovsky and his family moved to government-funded housing, and he began working while still attending high school.

To satisfy his ambitious family, which was encouraging him to be a businessman, Tartakovsky tried to take an advertising class, but signed up late and thereby had little choice over his classes. He was assigned to take an animation class and this led to his study of film at Columbia College Chicago before moving to Los Angeles to study animation at the California Institute of the Arts with his friend Rob Renzetti. There he met Craig McCracken. At CalArts, Tartakovsky directed and animated two student films, one of which became the basis for Dexter's Laboratory. After two years at CalArts, Tartakovsky got a job at Lapiz Azul Productions in Spain on Batman: The Animated Series. There, "he learned the trials of TV animation, labor intensive and cranking it out". While he was in Spain, his mother died of cancer.

Career
Craig McCracken acquired an art director job at Hanna-Barbera for the show 2 Stupid Dogs and recommended hiring Rob Renzetti and Tartakovsky as well. This was a major turning point in Tartakovsky's career. Hanna-Barbera let Tartakovsky, McCracken, Renzetti and Paul Rudish work in a trailer in the parking lot of the studio, and there Tartakovsky started creating his best-known works. Dexter's Laboratory grew out of a student film with the same title that he produced while at the California Institute of the Arts. Tartakovsky co-wrote and pencilled the 25th issue of the Dexter's Laboratory comic book series, titled "Stubble Trouble", as well as several stories which are collected in the Dexter's Laboratory Classics trade paperback. Additionally, he helped produce The Powerpuff Girls, co-directed several episodes and served as the animation director and a cinematographer for The Powerpuff Girls Movie; he co-wrote one of the franchise's comics. Both Dexter's Laboratory and The Powerpuff Girls were nominated repeatedly for Emmy Awards.

Tartakovsky created the action-adventures series Samurai Jack, which premiered in 2001; he also wrote comics for the franchise. The series won him an Emmy in the category of "Outstanding Animated Program (For Programming Less Than One Hour)" in 2004. Star Wars creator George Lucas hired Tartakovsky to direct Star Wars: Clone Wars (2003–2005), an animated series taking place between Attack of the Clones and Revenge of the Sith. The series won three Emmy awards: two for "Outstanding Animated Program (for Programming One Hour or More)" in 2004 and 2005, and another for "Outstanding Individual Achievement in Animation" (for background designer Justin Thompson in 2005). Tartakovsky was not involved in the 2008 follow-up series.

In 2005, Tartakovsky was appointed creative president of Orphanage Animation Studios. In 2006, he was chosen as the director for a sequel to The Dark Crystal, but was replaced and the film was later scrapped. Tartakovsky served as animation director on the pilot episode of Korgoth of Barbaria, which aired on Adult Swim in 2006 but was not picked up as a series. He also directed a series of anti-smoking advertisements, one for Nicorette in 2006 and two for Niquitin in 2008. In 2009, Tartakovsky created a pilot entitled Maruined for Cartoon Network's The Cartoonstitute program, which was not picked up. He also once worked on the Nicktoons Film Festival for Nickelodeon as part of the Grand Jury with Patrick Warburton and Steve Oedekerk.

In 2009, it was announced that Tartakovsky would write and direct a Samurai Jack film from Fred Seibert's Frederator Studios and J. J. Abrams' Bad Robot Productions. In June 2012, Tartakovsky said that he had a story to conclude the series and title character's story, but the project had been shelved after Abrams moved on to direct Star Trek. In 2010, Tartakovsky created storyboards for Jon Favreau's Iron Man 2. He created a new series for Cartoon Network, Sym-Bionic Titan, between 2010 and 2011. He had hoped to expand on the initial season, but it was not renewed. On 7 April 2011, an animated prologue by Tartakovsky for the horror film Priest premiered online.

In early 2011, Tartakovsky moved to Sony Pictures Animation, where he made his feature film directing debut with Hotel Transylvania (2012). In July 2012, he signed a long-term deal with Sony to develop and direct his own original projects. In June 2012, Sony announced that Tartakovsky was slated to direct a computer-animated Popeye feature. On 18 September 2014, Tartakovsky revealed an "animation test". In March 2015, Tartakovsky announced that despite the well-received test footage, he was no longer working on the project. He moved onto directing original story Can You Imagine?, announced in 2014, but it was cancelled.

Tartakovsky directed Hotel Transylvania 2, the sequel to Hotel Transylvania, released in 2015. In December 2015, Adult Swim announced that Tartakovsky would return for a final season of Samurai Jack, during which he stepped away from Sony Pictures Animation. When the series finished airing in 2017, Tartakovsky returned to Sony and directed Hotel Transylvania 3: Summer Vacation (2018). After its financial success, two original projects were announced: an R-rated comedy called Fixed and an action-adventure film entitled Black Knight.

In May 2019, it was announced that Adult Swim had commissioned a new series from Tartakovsky entitled Primal, which is about "a caveman at the dawn of evolution ... [and a] dinosaur on the brink of extinction". It began airing on 7 October 2019.

On 11 May 2020, it was announced that Tartakovsky's Popeye project was being revived by King Features Syndicate, with T. J. Fixman writing the script. Tartakovsky later clarified that he was not working on it yet and funding was still needed, saying that if he had the time he would do it. In mid-2022, an animatic for the film was leaked online and subsequently taken down.

Tartakovsky was involved in the development of the video game Samurai Jack: Battle Through Time, which was released on 21 August 2020. On 28 October, a new series by him called Unicorn: Warriors Eternal was announced; it will focus on a group of teen heroes, drawing inspiration from world mythology, and is being billed as all-ages animation. It is being produced by Cartoon Network Studios to be aired on Cartoon Network and HBO Max as part of an attempt by WarnerMedia to reach a broader range of the "older kid and tween market." This was confirmed in a February 2021 announcement which mentioned the series. Tartakovsky described the project as an "extension of everything that I've done from Dexter to Powerpuff to Samurai Jack. It's all those ideas that we practiced, that sometimes were successful, sometimes not as much".

On June 15, 2022, Tartakovsky inked a cross-studio overall deal with Cartoon Network Studios and Warner Bros. Animation that lets him develop, create and produce animated programs for a variety of platforms, either with original characters or with a Warner Bros. Discovery IP. Sam Register, president of both companies, said "Genndy is a true visionary who embodies the creator spirit of Cartoon Network Studios. As he continues to push the boundaries of storytelling and animation, we are excited to have a front row seat both here and now also at Warner Bros. Animation."

Personal life 
Tartakovsky married Dawn David in 2000 and has three children with her.

Filmography

Film

Television

Bibliography

Awards and nominations

Notes

References

 Genndy's Scrapbook (Samurai Jack Season 2 DVD, Disk 2)

External links

 
 Genndy Tartakovsky at About.com

1970 births
California Institute of the Arts alumni
Columbia College Chicago alumni
American animators
Jewish American artists
Living people
Soviet emigrants to the United States
American film directors
American voice directors
Primetime Emmy Award winners
Showrunners
Russian Jews
Sony Pictures Animation people
Soviet Jews
American animated film directors
American storyboard artists
Cartoon Network Studios people
Hanna-Barbera people
Annie Award winners
21st-century American Jews
American people of Russian-Jewish descent